Ectoedemia similella is a moth of the family Nepticulidae. It is found primarily in eastern North America.

The wingspan is 5–6 mm.

The larvae feed on Quercus palustris. They mine the leaves of their host plant. The egg is placed on the upper side of the leaf. The early portion of the mine is very narrow, completely filled with frass and bent several times in close S-shaped curves. Next, the larva mines just above the lower epidermis, forming a blotch scarcely visible above except for occasional spots here and there toward the edges of the blotch, where the leaf substance is more fully consumed. Then a conspicuous large blotch is formed where the mine is transparent and whitish, with frass accumulated toward the beginning of the blotch. The larvae are pale green and the cocoon is ochraceous.

References

External links
Nepticulidae of North America

Nepticulidae
Moths of North America

Taxa named by Annette Frances Braun
Leaf miners
Moths described in 1917